53 Ophiuchi is a multiple star system in the equatorial constellation of Ophiuchus. It is visible to the naked eye as a faint star with a combined apparent visual magnitude of 5.80. Located around 370 light years distant from the Sun based on parallax, it is moving closer to the Earth with a heliocentric radial velocity of −14 km/s. As of 2011, the visible components had an angular separation of  along a position angle of 190°.

The magnitude 5.82 primary, designated component Aa, is an A-type main-sequence star with a stellar classification of A2 V. It has 2.5 times the mass of the Sun and about 1.7 times the Sun's radius. The star is radiating 56 times the Sun's luminosity from its photosphere at an effective temperature of 9,311 K. The widely spaced secondary, designated component B, is a magnitude 7.8 A-type subgiant star with a class of A8 IV.

References

A-type main-sequence stars
A-type subgiants
Binary stars

Ophiuchus (constellation)
Ophiuchi, f
Durchmusterung objects
Ophiuchi, 53
159480
085998
6548